Jose Ruperto Martin Marfori Andanar (born August 21, 1974) is a Filipino television news personality, news anchor, radio commentator, podcaster, and voice-over artist. He served as the secretary of the Presidential Communications Office of the Philippines under the Duterte administration.

Andanar was the head of News5 Everywhere, the online news video and audio portal of TV5, anchored Andar ng mga Balita on TV5, Radyo5 92.3 News FM and One PH, sister stations of TV5. He was also a voice-over talent of News5, AksyonTV, and Radyo5 92.3 News FM.

In June 2016, it was announced that Andanar would be joining the administration of President Rodrigo Duterte as the secretary of the Presidential Communications Operations Office, replacing Sonny Coloma. He was tasked with supervising both the operations of the government's news and information agencies.

In March 2022, Andanar was named acting presidential spokesperson after former Cabinet Secretary Karlo Nograles was appointed as chairperson of the Civil Service Commission.

Personal life
Andanar was born on August 21, 1974, in Manila, Philippines to Wencelito Andanar and Rosario Marfori.

He is married to Alelee Aguilar-Andanar, the daughter of former Las Piñas mayor Vergel Aguilar and niece of Senator Cynthia Villar. They have two children and are currently living in Muntinlupa.

Education
Martin spent his high school years in Cagayan de Oro at Xavier University - Ateneo de Cagayan and Manila. After a year in University of the Philippines-Los Baños, he moved to Australia with his mother, where he graduated with a Bachelor of Arts in Social and Political Studies & Film and Media Studies at Federation University.

Andanar completed his Master in Entrepreneurship at the Asian Institute of Management in 2007.

In 2008, along with 30 Filipino youth leaders, the US State Department sent Andanar to Northern Illinois University for an International Visitors Leadership Fellowship Program. In June 2009, he went to Georgetown University in Washington, DC to attend an executive course in Public & Non Profit Management. He also completed a Senior Executive Fellows Program at the Harvard Kennedy School, Harvard University in March 2010.

Andanar attended courses on Communications in Public Policy Delivery (2015) and Countering Violent Extremism (2017) at the Lee Kuan Yew School of Public Policy in Singapore, as well as the FB News Literacy (2017) and APAC news literary executive course at the Hong Kong University. He also pursued further doctorate studies on Public Administration at the University of the Philippines-Diliman. and on Community Development at the University of the Philippines-Los Baños.

Broadcasting career (2000–present)

Andanar first worked for GMA News and Public Affairs as an anchor for the weekend edition of GMA Network News and first hosted Unang Hirit from 2000 to 2002, when he was transferred to the National Broadcasting Network (NBN) as anchor of Teledyaryo from 2002 until 2004, when he was transferred again to ABC/TV5's news division as anchor for Sentro from 2006 to 2008, TEN: The Evening News, Aksyon Weekend and Aksyon sa Umaga, Aksyon JournalisMO, Sapul sa Singko, Good Morning Club, Andar ng mga Balita (both the television and radio versions), Punto Asintado, and Aksyon sa Umaga.

He also hosted the documentary and public affairs shows such as S.O.S.: Stories of Survival (2005–2008), Pulis! Pulis! (2008–2009), Crime Klasik (2011–2012) and Dokumentado (2010–2013) on ABC/TV5/AksyonTV.

Official news voice image artist of TV5, Aksyon TV, and Radyo5 
He started as the news voice image artist of Aksyon TV and Radyo5 when he joined TV5 in 2009.

Champion and head of TV5 News digital video and audio portal "News5 Everywhere" 
Through his leadership, TV5 became the first news channel to establish digital presence for news delivery through the news digital video and audio portal “News5 Everywhere”.

Aside from being a talent, Andanar also dipped his fingers in management for TV5’ as a member of the News 5 Executive Management Committee.

Radyo5 and Aksyon TV image copywriter  
Andanar was a Radyo5 and Aksyon TV image copywriter.

Creator of Balut Radio  
Andanar was the creator of the defunct Balut Radio.

Creator of Martin's Mancave  
The podcast was created out of Andanar's hobby for radio and podcast. It started as a program to interview known personalities who are adept at certain topics, such as politics, arts, technology and education. In its latter days, the podcast was used as an extended arm of PCOO's Laging Handa Communications for the COVID-19 pandemic. It had broad discussions on the government's thrusts to mitigate the health crisis. and Mediaman's Mancave Podcasts.

Government career (2016–2022)

Andanar was appointed as secretary for the Presidential Communications Operations Office by President Rodrigo Duterte on June 30, 2016. The Commission on Appointments confirmed his appointment on October 12, 2016.

As PCOO secretary, Andanar spearheaded the formulation of a national communications strategy that focused the rehabilitation of existing government media and communications resources, and the development of new platforms for communicating and engaging with the public. Andanar was tasked with supervising both the operations of the government's news and information agencies, which includes the Philippine Information Agency (PIA), Philippine News Agency (PNA), People's Television Network (PTV), Philippine Broadcasting Service-Bureau of Broadcast Services (PBS-BBS), Bureau of Communications Services (BCS), National Printing Office (NPO), APO Production Unit, Radio Philippines Network (RPN), and Intercontinental Broadcasting Corporation (IBC).

Among the reforms made were the use of fiber optic Internet connection and a new website design, leading to higher visits. The PNA also established a three-layer editorial process to ensure the quality of content. Andanar's efforts to revitalize government media services earned the adulation of Senator JV Ejercito.

In July 2017, the Philippine Star published an article that found Andanar to be "richest official in his agency with a net worth higher than that of all his undersecretaries and assistant secretaries combined", Andanar declared a net worth of P152.27 million in his statement of assets, liabilities and net worth (SALN) submitted April 2017.

Freedom of Information 
PCOO secretary Martin Andanar championed the landmark freedom of information (FOI) policy of the government, which was made effective under Executive Order No. 2 signed in 2016.

This furthers the promotion of free access by the media and the general public to transactions, data, and information under the executive branch. It has established an agenda for good governance and transparency.

To this very day, the PCOO continues to push for the passage of a FOI law, which will broaden the scale and reach of transparency to all branches of government.

Presidential Task Force on Media Security 
Andanar also supervises the Presidential Task Force on Media Security (PTFoMS), which was formed in October 2016 after President Duterte asked for the creation of a special agency to protect media workers. As part of the agency's efforts, Andanar in 2018 presented the Kapisanan ng mga Brodkaster ng Pilipinas (KBP) with the Handbook on Personal Security Measures for Media Practitioners, a document that outlines how media workers may enlist government protection services against threats to their life and security. In December 2018, the PTFoMS filed murder charges against suspects in the killing of Albay radio personality Joey Llana, who was killed in June the same year. Reporters Without Borders also delisted the Philippines from its list of most dangerous countries for journalists in December 2018, which Andanar attributed to President Duterte's concern for journalists. The task force's creation and Andanar's efforts in managing it received praise from European Union (EU) Ambassador to the Philippines Franz Jessen.

In 2020, the Philippines has finally been out of the top five worst countries for journalists and was declared the “biggest mover” after moving to seventh place in the Committee to Protect Journalists' (CPJ) Global Impunity Index (GII) report published on October 28. The CPJ report was welcomed further by PTFoMS, under the supervision of Andanar as "an incontrovertible demonstration and validation of the government's unfeigned dedication to safeguarding press freedom and protecting the life, liberty and security of media workers in the country amid huge challenges."

Laging Handa Crisis Communications

To address the increasing demand for accurate information, PCOO secretary Martin Andanar conceptualized a Crisis Communications Plan, which was later called the Laging Handa Crisis Communications Campaign.

This became a strategy of government media in effectively reporting during crisis situations, including natural disasters and health emergencies, especially throughout the COVID-19 pandemic.

The Laging Handa Crisis Communications Campaign became handy during the COVID-19 pandemic providing streamlined information dissemination on government responses. Such an effort created various communications programs targeted to providing localized news and information.

Some notable programs initiated by Secretary Andanar were the Laging Handa Public Briefing and the Network Briefing News.

The Laging Handa Public Briefing is a weekday program which provides news to the public on the responses and programs of the national government during the pandemic.

National Information Convention

The National Information Convention or NIC has been conceptualized with the primary aim of strengthening partnership between public and private sector communicators.

The convention took place on February 19–21, 2018 at the SMX Convention Center in Lanang, Davao City with the theme, “Spurring Development and Empowering Communities through Information”.

In one of his interviews, Andanar said that the gathering aims to encourage the communicators to push for effective and responsible sharing of information likewise.

Dutertenomics
Dutertenomics is one of the flagship communication programs of the PCOO. It refers to the socioeconomic policies of President Duterte, which includes the development of infrastructure and industries. It was launched on April 18, 2017, by the Department of Finance (DOF) and the Presidential Communications Operations Office (PCOO) in a forum attended by local and international media, with discussions focused on President Duterte's 10-point socioeconomic reform agenda and its primary objective of accelerating poverty reduction and transforming the Philippines into a high middle-income economy by 2022.

It has since been replicated in similar communications roadshows in Cambodia during the 2017 World Economic Forum on the Association of Southeast Asian Nations, and at the sidelines of the 2017 One Belt One Road Forum for International Cooperation in Beijing, China.

Interim Social Media Practitioner Accreditation
On August 8, 2017, Andanar signed department order no. 15 entitled “Interim Social Media Practitioner Accreditation.” The department order stipulates that before social media publishers and bloggers could cover presidential and Malacañang events, they should be at least 18 years old with at least 5,000 followers to cover President Duterte. Andanar states that this order would enforce responsible journalism ethics on those who publish on social media and the bloggers.

Government Satellite Network
Andanar spearheaded creation of the Government Satellite Network (GSN), which can transmit “video, image, audio and data content,” and provide “two way or multiple 4k tele-conference communication, internet delivery capability and multiple tv channels,” throughout the Philippines islands using advanced satellite and IPTV technology.
 Andanar also announced that the People's Television Network Inc. (PTNI) will have increased transmission capacity to reach far-off areas with the help of the Integrated Services Digital Broadcast – Terrestrial (ISDB-T) system from Japan. He also said that 2023 is the target for switch-off of all analog broadcasts in the country.

Emergency Warning Broadcast System
The Emergency Warning Broadcast System (EWBS) is the first-ever early civil defense warning system for natural disasters in the Philippines, implemented on March 10, 2018. According to Andanar, the EWBS will utilize the government's broadcast channel, PTV to provide early warning during times of disasters. As well as providing updates on relief efforts to the affected communities.

Provincial Communications Officers’ Network
The Provincial Communications Officers Network (PCO Net) is a project of the Presidential Communications Operations Office under Secretary Martin Andanar to “ensure a coherent and efficient flow of information particularly from the Office of the President down to the national government agencies (NGAs), local government units (LGUs) and academe“ by providing a platform where provincial information officers can access information direct from Malacañan and distributed to their respective localities

The PCO Net also served as the foundation for the first National Information Convention (NIC), a gathering of one thousand five hundred government information officers, as well as “experts in the communication field, both government and non-government, digital and traditional.“ The three-day event was held from February 19 to 21 in Davao City. The convention is part of the PCOO's effort to give people a better appreciation and understanding of government programs and mechanisms so that “they can better participate in nation-building and development, acquire insights on best practices in public advocacy and social mobilization, and improve public-private partnership in development communication.”

Meeting with Maguindanao Massacre Survivors
In November 2018, Andanar and PCOO Undersecretary Joel Egco met with survivors of victims of the Maguindanao massacre, including clan leader Esmael Mangudadatu, and told them that a guilty verdict against suspects is expected to be served in early 2019. Andanar and his staff also visited the site of the massacre itself, and is the first ever Presidential Communications Secretary to visit the massacre memorial.

Office of the Global Media Affairs
Under Andanar, the PCOO created the Office of Global Media Affairs in November 2018 in order to help bridge Philippine government media with the international community. The OGMA addresses the concerns or questions of foreign correspondents not in the Philippines and in other parts of the world. Andanar says the agency will form a press attaché division, members of which will be sent to other countries as Philippine government media representatives. The PCOO also has an International Press Center that accredits foreign journalists covering the Philippines.

Partnership with Myanmar
The Philippine and Myanma governments in January 2019 signed a memorandum of understanding (MOU) to establish stronger mechanisms for information sharing and media cooperation. Andanar said both countries can promote culture, arts, education, tourism or "anything that will benefit the two states" through information sharing.

Public Briefing: #LagingHanda PH
The Laging Handa is the first comprehensive crisis communications program in the Philippines, spearheaded and conceptualized by Andanar in 2016, that streamlines all government media agencies for information dissemination. During the pandemic, the Laging Handa evolved into a robust television, radio, and online program that became the go-to-program for covid related information in the Philippines, in partnership with the Kapisanan ng mga Brodkaster ng Pilipinas (KBP).

Andanar anchored Public Briefing: #LagingHandaPH, a press briefing for the COVID-19 pandemic in the Philippines produced by PCOO and aired on PTV, RPN/CNN Philippines, IBC, Radyo Pilipinas 1 and other radio and television stations across the Philippines.

Network Briefing News 
The Network Briefing News was created at the height of the pandemic, bridging local government units nationwide to the national government. Through the program, local chief executives are able to report the initiatives they have undertaken in protecting their respective communities against the spread of the COVID-19. They are also able to request for additional support to the national government, which are directly responded to by concerned government agencies.

Aside from discussing matters regarding the COVID-19, it also reached out to communities whoa re affected by natural disasters.

These also became another platform for youth leaders to showcase their engagements and encourage youth participation in their respective communities.

UN Speech
Secretary Andanar delivered the Philippine dignitary statement at the High-Level Segment of the 43rd Session of the Human Rights Council on February 26, 2020, that highlighted the Duterte administration's policy on media freedom and human rights. “We repeat the call for prudence in assessing claims particularly from sources who have enjoyed the hallowed status of human rights defenders while waging the longest insurgency in Asia and terrorizing communities in the Philippines,” said Secretary Andanar, who is the first Philippine Communications Secretary to speak before the Human Rights Council.

Duterte Legacy
The Duterte Legacy is PCOO's communication campaign showcasing how the lives of Filipinos were impacted and affected by the programs and projects of the Duterte Administration as it provides government services to ensure that the Filipinos' lives become better and healthier. It "centers on the accomplishments of the key three pillars of the president's legacy, which are peace and order, infrastructure and development, and poverty alleviation," according to Secretary Andanar.

News website Vera Files found materials used for the campaign to be apparently misleading, "some of the claims were indeed true, many lacked proper context, while others were either misleading or inaccurate."

Mindanao Media Hub

Aside from the massive operations in disseminating updates and news, the PCOO also modernized its facilities in both radio and television in order to provide news that are more tailor-fitted to regions.

Secretary Andanar pushed for the construction of new media hubs outside Metro Manila that will demonstrate the upscaled capacity of government media in providing information to the public nationwide, and especially to provinces.

More infrastructure projects for government media workers are eyed to be built after the successful launch of the Mindanao Media Hub in Davao City.

The P700-million worth Mindanao Media Hub is the first government media hub established outside Metro Manila. The facility houses PCOO's satellite office in Davao City, as well as its attached agencies – People's Television Network Inc. (PTV), News and Information Bureau – Philippine News Agency (NIB-PNA), Philippine Information Agency (PIA), Philippine Broadcasting Service (PBS), Presidential Broadcast Staff – Radio Television Malacañang (PBS-RTVM), APO Production Unit, Inc. (APO), and National Printing Office (NPO).

It was soft launched in December 2020 and had its inauguration and official first broadcast through PTV-4 on March 18, 2021.

Plans for the Government Communication Academy and the Visayas Media Hub are underway. New buildings for regional offices of the Philippine Information Agency are also being built.

Visayas Media Hub
The  Visayas Visayas Media Hub will soon rise at the Subangdaku Wireless DICT lot – Innovation Hub Zone in Mandaue City after Congress  approved the inclusion of the P300 million budget for its construction for the year 2022.

Secretary Andanar has sought help from former Presidential Aide and Senator Christopher “Bong” Go for this which was then welcomed by legislators. Aside from the P300M budget for the construction of the hub, another P300M will be allotted for state-of-the-art broadcast equipment and facilities. Once finished, this will be the first government media hub established in the Visayas and will serve asas the main broadcast center for Central Visayas, Eastern Visayas, and Western Visayas.

Government Communications Academy
The planned establishment of a Government Communications Academy (GCA) in Bukidnon will be devoted to imparting knowledge on effective and strategic public communication as it will house a government TV, a radio center, and has a modern dormitory for personnel.

The GCA is one of the government's institutional initiatives consistent with the government's goal of having an enlightened and empowered citizenry to make informed decisions towards improved quality of life and contribute to nation-building.

Media Workers' Welfare Bill
In January 2021, around 218 congressmen voted in favor of the passage of House Bill 8140 or the proposed Media Workers’ Welfare on its third and final reading at the House of Representatives.

The HB 8140, authored by ACT- CIS Representative Niña Taduran, aims to provide enhanced protection, security, and benefits for media workers, to which PCOO has been among different agencies who have been pushing for its swift passage in congress.

International Cooperation

In line with President Rodrigo Duterte's “independent foreign policy” adoption and implementation, Secretary Martin M. Andanar intensified the PCOO's engagements, through bilateral agreements and cooperation on various communications partnerships and collaborations, with traditional and non-traditional partner countries of the Philippines to realize his goal, and that of the Duterte administration, of making the PCOO a world-class news and information organization for the Filipino people.

Some prominent international agreements that Secretary Andanar accomplished are listed below:

 Russia

In November 2017, a Memorandum of Understanding was signed between the PCOO and the Ministry of Telecom and Mass Communications of Russia to cooperate in the field of mass communications.

 China

The PCOO and its attached agencies strengthened media engagements and cooperations with its counterparts in China through signing several Memoranda of Agreement on various information and communications exchanges.

In 2016, the PCOO and the China's State Council Information office signed an agreement on news and information exchange, training, and for other purposes that have directly benefited both institutions' personnel in expanding their skills and capabilities.

Throughout 2017, the PCOO and its attached agencies signed agreements with China Radio International on various programs and projects, such as the joint production of Mga Pinoy sa Tsina documentary series; cooperation on visiting mechanism, staff exchange, and program cooperation; and cooperation on China Theater.

The PCOO as well, through the People's Television Network Inc., signed a rebroadcasting agreement with China Central Television Group to further the coverage and information exchanges between the two institutions for a closer Philippines – China relations.

 Japan

To further the crisis communications and management capabilities of the PCOO, a Memorandum of Cooperation with Japan's Ministry of Internal Affairs and Communications has signed the Delivery of Disaster Information through Emergency Warning Broadcasting System and Data Broadcasting of Digital Terrestrial Television Broadcasting in 2017.

This has not only benefited the PCOO, but also the Filipino people, especially in times of natural calamities, with better capabilities to disseminate news and information.

 South Korea

In 2018, the PCOO and South Korea's Ministry of Culture, Sports, and Tourism signed an agreement on mutual staff visits, training and exchange in the field of broadcasting to broaden the skills and capabilities of both institutions’ personnel.

The two government agencies, through the agreement, aimed at undertaking joint or individual activities and programs that would help strengthen cooperation and create favorable conditions for the broad and free dissemination of information to further increase the knowledge and understanding about the life and culture of both countries.

 Hungary

In August 2018, the PCOO, through the Philippine News Agency, signed a Memorandum of Understanding with Hungary's Médiaszolgáltatás-támogató és Vagyonkezelő Alap to further both countries’ cooperation on news exchanges.

 Myanmar

To further both countries’ media and communications capabilities for public service, the PCOO and Myanmar's Ministry of Information signed a Memorandum of Understanding on Information Cooperation in the Field of News Exchange, Radio and Television Broadcasting, Film Industries, Public Relations, Printing and Publishing in 2019 to further both countries’.

 Thailand

As various forms of media have allowed the public to be updated on developments around the world and to further Philippines – Thailand bilateral relations, the PCOO and Thailand's Public Relations Department signed a Memorandum of Understanding on Information and Media Cooperation.

Through this, the awareness, the understanding, and the knowledge that proceed from the agreement underline the honored values both countries uphold, in the profession of journalism and public relations.

Digitalization of Media, Information, and Communications Operations 

 Increase in Social Media Followers

In response to the Duterte administration's agenda of making the government closer to the Filipino public, PCOO Secretary Martin M. Andanar intensified the government agency and its attached agencies’ online and digital presence, especially on social media outlets.

It is through digitalization of operations that news and information, particularly the policies, programs, and pronouncements of President Rodrigo Duterte and his administration, are made available to Filipinos anytime and anywhere around the world.

Online platforms of the PCOO are also reaching millions of Filipinos and it is even being amplified through the PCOO's collaborative partnership with the Kapisanan ng mga Brodkaster ng Pilipinas (KBP), especially throughout the COVID-19 pandemic.
 Started Online Presidential Engagements

As the PCOO and its attached agencies improved its operations in terms of broadcasting and information dissemination in various modes of communication, it has made President Rodrigo Duterte visible and closer to the Filipino public.

By streamlining the government communications arm, especially through the Radio-Television Malacañang (RTVM), the government is now able to air live the pronouncements of the President – his State of the Nation Addresses, Talk to the People, media interviews and briefings, meetings, and other significant gatherings with local and international officials, among others, for the Filipino public.

These are being complemented by the unrelenting, strong and proactive social media platforms of the PCOO and its attached agencies, apart from television and radio programs undertaken, that are accessible to Filipinos anywhere in the world.

Other Strides of PCOO 
 Filling of Plantilla Positions
Since 2016, the PCOO has been regularizing employees who have been with the communications arm for five years or longer, and have been in short-term renewable contracts that denied them the security, opportunities, and benefits of full-time employees.

The PCOO also requested additional plantilla positions from the Department of Budget and Management (DBM).

To date, the DBM has granted the PCOO plantilla positions but the agency is working on increasing this number in order to regularize more.

As Acting Presidential Spokesperson
On March 7, 2022, Andanar was appointed as acting Presidential Spokesperson following the appointment of former Cabinet Secretary and Acting Presidential Spokesperson Karlo Nograles as chairman of the Civil Service Commission.

"Kung ano man ang atas sa atin ni Pangulong Duterte ay gawin natin (We should do what President Duterte asked us to do our work) because we signed up for his job. It's an honor to serve the President in his remaining days in office." Andanar mentioned as he gave his first public briefing on March 8, 2022, at 12noon.

Criticisms 
Andanar and his team are widely criticized by media and activists for being purveyors of fake news and propaganda.

"Review your history" 
In November 2016, Sen. Koko Pimentel told Andanar "Review your history.", after Andanar referred to Anti-Marcos protesters who opposed the hero's burial of the late dictator as "temperamental brats". Pimentel called the protestors "principled", adding "they come from the poorest sectors of society and therefore, cannot be labeled as "brats. They can never be called brats. These are actually principled positions. So Martin Andanar should review his history,"

Awards and recognitions

Andanar received the Distinguished Alumnus Award from the Federation University in Australia in 2017. The National Press Club in October 2018 honored Andanar with lifetime membership and a plaque of appreciation in recognition of his efforts to protect journalists and increase transparency and accountability in governance. Among other things that Andanar worked for was a discount for NPC members at the Chinese General Hospital.
In November 2018, he was made an honorary member of the Cagayan de Oro Press Club, the oldest press club in the Philippines.

Presidential citation 
Andanar received a Presidential Citation from President Duterte in December 2018 that commended the PCOO's work in the successful chairmanship of the Philippines for Association of Southeast Asian Nations (ASEAN) Summit in 2017. The awarding was held at the Heroes' Hall in Malacanang Palace. Andanar dedicated the honor for the award to his colleagues at the agency. With him to receive the award was Rhea Cy, Officer-In-Charge of the Planning and Communication Research Division of the Philippine Information Agency.

2019 awards 
The Daily Tribune awarded Andanar the Best Media Personality of 2018 in January 2019, recognizing his contribution to promoting the welfare and safety of media workers in the country through the creation of the Presidential Task Force on Media Security (PTFoMS).

The National Consumers Affairs Foundation (NCAF) recognized Andanar in January 2019 as an outstanding media icon and broadcaster during its People's Choice Awards ceremony, held jointly with the Dangal ng Bayan Awards in Quezon City.

The Presidential Anti-Corruption Commission (PACC) in March 2019 commended Andanar for his "valuable contribution and unfailing assistance to the PACC in the pursuit of its mandate to weed out corruption".

Andanar was recognized as an outstanding Mindanaonon during the 1st Mindanao Governance and Leadership Excellence Awards held at Limketkai Luxe Hotel in March 2019, for having significantly improved the People's Television Network (PTV), Radyo ng Bayan, Radio-Television Malacañang (RTVM) and Philippine News Agency (PNA) in less than two years.

In August 2019, the Rotary Club of Metro Surigao recognized him as among the outstanding Surigaonons in the field of government service. The Rotary Outstanding Surigaonon Award (ROSA) award is the most prestigious award in Surigao del Norte, as it recognizes individuals and institutions that go beyond oneself, create a real difference, and touch the lives of many. In his acceptance speech Andanar said, "There is a volume of grateful emotions that are contained in the words, 'Thank you.' Let me summarize them by acknowledging that the Rotary Outstanding Surigaonon Award includes the people I am honored and privileged to serve,"

On September 25, 2019, The Philippine Cancer Society Inc. (PCSI) named Andanar the "Most Effective Communicator" for his support of the organization's cause. The PCSI in 2017 recognized Andanar as among their “men of extraordinary influence.”

On November 29, 2019, Andanar received the Outstanding Alumnus Award for Professional Service in Communication from the Xavier University – Ateneo de Cagayan, for his “initiative in media digitalization, making information and news communication reach a wide range people in the country, keeping them updated and aware of developments nationally and internationally."

Commissioned Commander of the Philippine Navy Reserve Force 
Andanar, whose commission order was released on May 25, 2020, took his oath as commissioned commander of the Philippine Navy Reserve Force at the Philippine Navy headquarters on October 2, 2020. The commissioning was pursuant to the National Defense Act, which grants military officership rank to presidential appointees as recommended by the Chief of Staff.

International Awards 
Andanar received a “Media Hero of the Year” Award in the prestigious 2021 Asia Pacific Stevie® Awards for his innovations in PCOO, and proactive daily delivery of news and information to the Filipino public. It was made possible by Laging Handa Dokyu, Network Briefing News and Public Briefing #LagingHandaPH programs even at the start of the COVID-19 pandemic. Along with these are other programs delivering to the public straight news and information about the coronavirus.

Outstanding Filipino Luminary Award 
The EspiCom group has hailed Andanar as a recipient of the Outstanding Filipino Luminary Award for National Government Service in 2021.

The Outstanding Filipino Luminary Award bears the theme “Inspiring the Filipino people amidst the pandemic”, which honors and highlights the valuable contribution of the leaders, the civic movers, and innovators that have propelled the country's economy and inspired their fellowmen during this pandemic.

Andanar was given the award “for being the catalyst of effective media through his current undertaking as the Head of PCOO.”

References

1974 births
Living people
Filipino television news anchors
Filipino radio journalists
Filipino podcasters
GMA Network personalities
GMA Integrated News and Public Affairs people
TV5 (Philippine TV network) personalities
News5 people
Secretaries of the Presidential Communications Operations Office
People from Quezon City
People from Cagayan de Oro
Federation University Australia alumni
Duterte administration cabinet members
Asian Institute of Management alumni